The Great Sensation is a 1925 American silent drama film directed by Jay Marchant and starring William Fairbanks, Pauline Garon and Lloyd Whitlock. The son of a wealthy family masquerades as a chauffeur, and thwarts the plans of a jewel thief.

Cast
 William Fairbanks as Jack 
 Pauline Garon as Peggy Howell 
 Lloyd Whitlock as Captain Winslow 
 Billy Franey as Harry Ruby 
 Winifred Landis as Mrs. Franklin Curtis 
 Adelaide Hallock as Mrs. Howell 
 William McLaughlin as Mr. Howell 
 Pauline Paquette as Maid

References

Bibliography
 Munden, Kenneth White. The American Film Institute Catalog of Motion Pictures Produced in the United States, Part 1. University of California Press, 1997.

External links

1925 films
1925 drama films
Silent American drama films
Films directed by Jay Marchant
American silent feature films
1920s English-language films
American black-and-white films
Columbia Pictures films
1920s American films